Hebeloma fragilipes is a species of mushroom in the family Hymenogastraceae.

fragilipes
Fungi of Europe